Angle Creek is a stream in Lake and Peninsula Borough, Alaska, in the United States.

Angle Creek was so named because of its course.

See also
 List of rivers of Alaska

References

Rivers of Lake and Peninsula Borough, Alaska
Rivers of Alaska